The 1993–94 Syracuse Orangemen basketball team represented Syracuse University in the 1993–94 NCAA Division I men's basketball season.  The Head coach was Jim Boeheim, serving for his 18th year.  The team played home games at the Carrier Dome in Syracuse, New York.  The team finished with a 23–7 (13–5) record and advanced to Sweet Sixteen of the NCAA tournament.

Roster

Schedule and results

|-
!colspan=9 style=| Regular season

|-
!colspan=9 style=| Big East tournament

|-
!colspan=9 style=| NCAA tournament

Rankings

References

External links
1993-1994 Syracuse Orangemen at Orangehoops.org

Syracuse Orange
Syracuse Orange men's basketball seasons
Syracuse
Syracuse Orange
Syracuse Orange